Emmaste is a village in Hiiumaa Parish, Hiiu County in northwestern Estonia.

Emmaste got its village status in 1977. Before it was an Emmaste settlement, which was formed in 1920s on the basis of Emmaste Manor. Eastern part of the village is known as Nõmme. In 1920s and 1930s, the Nõmme was a standalone village. In 1977, the nearby village Viiterna was merged with Emmaste village.

References
 

Villages in Hiiu County
Kreis Wiek